Happy Ever after is a 1954 British comedy film directed by Mario Zampi and starring David Niven, Yvonne De Carlo, Barry Fitzgerald and George Cole. Its plot concerns the accidental death of an Irish landowner who bequeaths his estate to his cousin. It was released in the United States under the title Tonight's the Night.

Production
The film was originally known as O'Leary Night. It was shot at the Elstree Studios of Associated British with sets designed by art director Ivan King. Forty Hall near Enfield doubled for the ancestral Irish home of the O'Learys. Location shooting also took place in Braughing in Hertfordshire, where the railway station was renamed Rathbarney for the duration of the filming.

De Carlo said: "I think it will help me in comedy when it is released in this country. I have had my share of sirens and am happy to get away from them no matter what the part."

Plot
Aged General O'Leary is fatally injured while trying to jump a wall with his horse. On his deathbed, the beloved old Irishman bequeaths £1,000 each to his faithful longtime servant Thady O'Heggarty, his neighbor and fellow landowner Major Monty McGluskey for care and feeding of the General's horse and dog, and to Doctor Michael Flynn for keeping him alive longer than he probably would have lived otherwise. The General also cancels all debts owed to him. The rest of the estate goes to a distant relative, Jasper O'Leary, who has never before set foot in the hamlet of Rathbarney.

Jasper very quickly wears out his warm welcome, proving to be an unscrupulous cad who had been saved from marrying a rich but unattractive woman in Capri by his unexpected windfall. He is attracted to Serena McGluskey, a beautiful young widow who has just returned to Rathbarney following the death of her husband. Jasper confides his plan to Serena, "Once I squeeze the lemon dry, I'm off."

Jasper is so unpopular that some of the disgruntled locals gather in Dooley's pub and decide to participate in a secret lottery to see who will be assigned the task of murdering him. Dooley's assistant, Terence, faints when he is chosen. Lacking confidence in his ability, several groups (without each other's knowledge), decide to do the job themselves. However, working at cross purposes and sometimes just by being unlucky, none of them succeed.

Meanwhile, Doctor Flynn is still infatuated with Serena, despite having been jilted by her in the past. He is too blind to see that her sister Kathy is in love with him. Serena's interest in Jasper (and vice versa) eventually cures him. When Serena constantly turns down Jasper's repeated proposals of a dalliance, he asks her to marry him. She agrees.

Finally, on the night when supposedly the ghost of one of Jasper's ancestors walks the halls, all of the various plotters make another try, but once again interfere with each other. Jasper also takes the opportunity to try to burn down the ancestral mansion for the insurance. None succeed. Then, Father Cormac shows up and makes an announcement. General O'Leary had instructed him to open a letter on that day. The letter contains a new will, which is to go into effect if Jasper proved to be unworthy, leaving the estate to Major McGluskey. Jasper offers to depart if the others will hold off on their murderous attempts. To his surprise and delight, Serena asks to go with him.

Reception
The film was a success at the British box office and is among most successful productions made by Associated British. According to Kinematograph Weekly the film was a "money maker" at the British box office in 1954.

It was released in the United States in December 1954 by Allied Artists.

Cast

 David Niven as Jasper O'Leary
 Yvonne De Carlo as Serena McGluskey
 Barry Fitzgerald as Thady O'Heggarty
 George Cole as Terence
 A. E. Matthews as General O'Leary
 Noelle Middleton as Kathy McGluskey
 Robert Urquhart as Doctor Michael Flynn
 Michael Shepley as Major McGluskey
 Joseph Tomelty as Dooley
 Eddie Byrne as Lannigan
 Liam Redmond as Regan
 Jimmy Mageean as Divarsion
 Patrick McAlinney as 	O'Connor
 Brian O'Higgins as Milligan
 Patrick Westwood as Murphy
 Fred Johnson as Father Cormac
 Ronan O'Casey as Reporter
 Michael Martin Harvey as Villager 
 Denis Martin as 	Singer
 Bill Shine as 	Saxby
 Anthony Nicholls as Solicitor
 Harry Hutchinson as Old Porter
 Tommy Duggan as Toastmaster
 Valerie French as Girl at Hunt Ball

References

External links
 
 

1954 films
1954 comedy films
British comedy films
Films shot at Associated British Studios
Films directed by Mario Zampi
Films set in Ireland
Films shot in Hertfordshire
1950s English-language films
1950s British films